Chichimequillas is a village in the Mexican state of Querétaro. It is located in the municipality of El Marqués. It has 3717 inhabitants, and is located at 1970 meters above sea level.

References

[] Guide from Mexico Desconocido magazine

Populated places in Querétaro